Debbie Green-Vargas (born June 25, 1958) is a former American volleyball player and coach. She is regarded as the greatest American women's volleyball setter of all time. Green-Vargas was a member of the U.S. National Team and won the silver medal at the 1984 Los Angeles Olympics.

Early life 
Debbie Green was born in South Korea in 1958. She grew up in California and attended Westminster High School. At the age of 16 Green-Vargas was a part of the Adidas Junior Team which swept the USVBA Nationals.  She was named an All-American, the youngest player ever to be so honored.

Collegiate career
Despite her small stature, Green was a two time All-American setter at USC. She perfected the jump set, allowing her to meet the ball higher in the vertical plane and create a higher tempo in the offense.  In doing so she was able to consistently create opportunities advantageous for her hitters.  In 1977, Green led the Trojans to a 38–0 record and an AIAW National Championships.  Hers was the first college volleyball team to ever register a perfect season.  Green led the Trojans to their second National Championship the following year in 1978. She won the Broderick Award, (now the Honda Sports Award) as the nation's best female collegiate volleyball player in 1978.

Olympic career
Green was on the roster for the 1980 Olympic, but was disappointed by the 1980 Olympic boycott. In 1984, Green helped team USA to a silver medal, at the time the best finish in U.S. women's volleyball history. This was later matched by the 2008 team, and eventually beaten by the 2021 team's gold medal.

Professional
Green played for the Los Angeles Starlites of Major League Volleyball (MLV), a women's professional indoor league, and helped the squad earn the league's first two championships in 1987 and 1988

Green-Vargas was an assistant coach for the Long Beach State women's volleyball team for 23 years, retiring after the 2008–09 season.

Personal life
Green-Vargas earned a BA in communications from Long Beach State in 1992.

Green married Joe Vargas and has two children, Nicole and Dana. Nicole played setter at Long Beach State, where Green-Vargas worked as an assistant coach. Dana was a setter for UCSB.

In 1986, she was selected to the United States Volleyball Association Hall of Fame, and in the spring of 1986 received the All-Time Great Volleyball Player award. On April 30, 1998, Green became the first woman to enter the Orange County Sports Hall of Fame.

References

External links

Debbie Green-Vargas at Long Beach State official website

1958 births
Living people
American women's volleyball players
American volleyball coaches
California State University, Long Beach alumni
Olympic silver medalists for the United States in volleyball
People from Westminster, California
USC Trojans women's volleyball players
Volleyball players at the 1984 Summer Olympics
Medalists at the 1984 Summer Olympics
Pan American Games silver medalists for the United States
Pan American Games medalists in volleyball
Setters (volleyball)
Volleyball players at the 1983 Pan American Games
Medalists at the 1983 Pan American Games
Volleyball players from California